The Saab 9-5 is an executive car that was produced by the Swedish automobile maker Saab from 1997 to 2012.

The first generation 9-5 was introduced in 1997 for the 1998 model year, as the replacement to the Saab 9000. At the time, the car represented a significant development for the manufacturer. In the United States, the 9-5 was introduced in the spring of 1998, for the 1999 model year.

On September 15, 2009, the second generation was presented at the Frankfurt Motor Show and production began in March 2010. It was the first Saab to be launched under Spyker Cars' ownership, even though it was developed almost completely under GM's ownership. Production ceased in 2012 amid the liquidation of the manufacturer.

Overview
Saab badged the model as the Saab 95, but consistently advertised it as the Saab 9-5, pronounced "nine five" rather than "ninety-five". This model should not be confused with the Saab 95, produced from 1959 to 1978.

The first generation 9-5 was available with sedan and station wagon body styles. Aerodynamically, the sedan's drag coefficient is 0.29, and the station wagon's is 0.31 (U.S. version 0.33). Introduced in 1999, the wagon features innovations such as floor tracks to secure cargo and a sliding load floor to make loading easier.

The 9-5 was the first production vehicle to offer ventilated seats, as well as asymmetrical turbocharging in the case of the 3.0L V6 engine.

The last 9-5 sedan of the first generation rolled off the Trollhättan production line at the beginning of July 2009, and the last wagon was assembled on February 1, 2010. Between the summer of 1997, when 9-5 production began, and 2010, 252,236 sedans, and 231,357 wagons were built. The total production 483,593 units, was narrowly beaten by its predecessor, the 9000, of which 503,000 were built.

Production equipment for the first-generation 9-5 was sold by General Motors to BAIC of China in 2009.

First generation (YS3E, 1997–2010)

Engines
The first-generation 9-5 is powered by Saab's B205 and B235 straight-4 engines, and from 2002 in Europe by an Opel Ecotec X22DTH 2.2 diesel engine (Saab D223L), replaced in 2006 by Fiat's 1.9 JTD 16V diesel straight-4. A turbocharged version of the GM 54° V6 engine, designated by Saab as B308, has a unique asymmetrical low-pressure turbocharger and was available from 1999 to 2003.  This engine is available only with an automatic transmission, and cars with this engine installed are distinguishable by their twin tailpipes. The V6 is only available on Arc, SE, and Griffin models. In 2004, the V6 engine was replaced by a high pressure turbo straight-4 engine producing . By 2006 this engine was producing  even in the non-Aero or non-sport models (US models).

The B2x5 engines can suffer from oil pickup issues caused by 'oil sludge' in the lubrication circuit. In 1999, Saab issued a Workshop Bulletin around this issue. The 'sludge' issue primarily affected earlier models between 1999 and 2003, and from 2004 a revised engine positive crankcase ventilation system (PCV) and the use of fully synthetic oil were introduced.

Saab created retrofit kits for the earlier 1999–2003 cars as the PCV design differs from the 2004 and later system. In 2005, Saab extended the warranty on the B2x5 engine to eight years and unlimited miles from new for original owners, provided the owner could produce proof that they had followed the manufacturer's oil change intervals. Saab recommended the use of fully synthetic or synthetic-blend oil as a preventative measure.

Engine choices

Transmissions
The 9-5 is available with an Aisin AW 4-speed (50-42LE) automatic transmission Saab reference FA47; from 1997 until 2001, when a new Aisin AW unit replaced the dated four-speed automatic with a five-speed automatic. A five-speed manual transmission is fitted as standard to the base models and the Aero. Six-speed manual transmission was not offered in first-generation 9-5s.

Alternative propulsion

E85
In 2005, an updated version of the 2.0 L turbocharged I4 was introduced in the European market together with the 2006 9–5. The engine was sold as 2.0t BioPower, optimized to run on E85 producing 132 kW (180 hp) at 5500 rpm. There was also a 2.3T BioPower version sold from 2007. It was also introduced in Australia.

E100
In 2007, Saab presented a 9-5 E100 Concept, based on the turbo 2.0. Offering a claimed  and 295 lb-ft (400 Nm) of torque, the Concept included the use of increased boost pressure and compression ratio.

Safety
The 9-5 introduced Saab's Active Head Restraints (SAHR), which moved up and forward to prevent whiplash when the car was struck from the rear. This feature won technology and safety awards in Australia, Denmark, and the United Kingdom. The Saab 9-5 also was one of the first cars to have extensive side-crash protection.

The front seats featured torso airbags and head airbags even on the earliest models, which few contemporary vehicles did in the late 1990s. The basic structure included a robust passenger safety cage, front and rear deformation zones, reinforced door posts and pillars, as well as the "Pendulum B-Pillar", which combined high-strength low-alloy steel at chest and head height with tailored blank steel at the floorpan, designed to direct the crash forces down toward the floor. The design was proven by the Insurance Institute for Highway Safety (IIHS) to protect occupants in side crashes, even without the addition of curtain airbags or rear side airbags. From 2002, ESP (electronic stability control) was included as standard.

Another Saab feature, the "Night Panel", permitted dousing of the instrument panel lighting, except for essential information, for less distraction when driving at night. Once activated, only essential information such as current speed is displayed except, for example, if the car requires fuel or the engine overheats.

In the United States OnStar was available, and provided as standard equipment in selected 9-5's from 2001 onward.

Comfort 
The 9-5 had various comfort features both as standard and cost options over the years.

While early models frequently had dash mounted cassette decks, CD changers were standard features on many cars and in-dash satellite navigation was also available. Factory-fitted phone kits were similarly optional.

Many models featured leather or part-leather upholstery and both front and rear heated seats were also available. A few models were shipped with the optional ventilated seats.

Cruise control was available on various models and xenon headlamps were fitted as standard on high-end variants.

Aero
The performance 9-5 Aero, the earliest versions of which were sometimes referred to as the HOT Aero, was first released in 2000 with a 2.3T B235R engine. The B235R engine of the 9-5 Aero was capable of providing immense torque and, in terms of acceleration, outperformed the contemporary Porsche 911 Turbo from 40 to 90 mph.

Initially badged as a  engine, Saab later conceded that the 230 PS power figure was quite conservative, with the manual versions rated 250 PS and having more torque than stated. This flagship model had a long list of standard features, a sport tuned suspension, and body side moldings. In 2002 a  2.3 turbo engine was made standard, which allowed for more torque after 4500 rpm. All Aero models from 2002 to 2005 have an identical engine layout and management system, with the 2002-05 models just having a slightly remapped version of that ECU from factory.

From model year 2006 to end of production, the  B235R was the standard engine in the 9–5 in both the 2.3T and Aero trims. 2006 had only one badge designation, the 2.3T and appointments normally found on the Aero could be added via a "Sport Package".

From 2007 onwards, SAAB added an Aero badge to the trunk lid to distinguish from regular 2.3T models. In addition, almost all standard features on the Aero were standard on the 2.3T, the exceptions being sport-tuned chassis, two-tone leather upholstery, "Anniversary" wheels and brushed aluminum interior trim, all of which were standard on Aero and not available on the 2.3T.

Police car
The 9-5 was used as a liveried patrol vehicle, as well as undercover, in several parts of its native Sweden, alongside the Volvo V70. Several police forces in the UK also used the 9–5 in their fleets, mostly in Aero specification. The city of Aspen, Colorado, used Saabs as patrol cars from early 1970s until 2005, when they discontinued the 9–5 in favor of the Volvo XC90. The town of Vail, Colorado likewise used Saabs from 1980 onwards, but in 2005, the black 9-5 patrol cars were replaced by Ford Explorers, due to budget reasons.

In 2006, Lothian and Borders Police in Edinburgh, Scotland, began operating three Saab 9-5 Aero 2.3T patrol cars as part of a fleet of 580 vehicles. These 9-5s were customised to police specifications by the Saab, Vauxhall and Chevrolet Special Vehicles Operation (SVO) in Papworth, Cambridgeshire. In undercover guise, these cars were outwardly identical to the Linear Sport models, but featured the 260 bhp Aero drivetrain.

In Poland, an unmarked 9-5 is used as a video-pursuit vehicle, in the Płock area.

Gallery

Second generation (YS3G, 2010–2012)

A next generation 9-5 built on the Global Epsilon platform was presented at the Frankfurt International Auto Show in September 2009. The vehicle had its North American debut in October 2009 at the South Florida Auto Show in Miami.
On November 24, 2009, the first pre-series Saab 9-5 of the new generation rolled off the Trollhättan production line.

With the announcement of the sale of Saab to Spyker on January 26, 2010, the new generation Saab 9-5 was taken into production at the Saab plant in Trollhättan. Full production began in April 2010, with the cars appearing in dealerships on June 19. Saab introduced a wagon variant of the new 9–5, dubbed "SportCombi," at the 2011 Geneva Motor Show. The Saab 9-5 Sedan 2.8 V6 Turbo was named Car of the Year in Singapore by "Wheels Asia".

Production of the 9-5  ended in March 2011 with Trollhättan production stopping due to the company's failing liquidity. Total production numbers of the Gen II Saab 9-5 ended at 11,280 units.

While several prototype vehicles and a number of production SportCombis were manufactured, the official variant did not enter serial production prior to Saab's bankruptcy in December 2011, and the vehicles never reached dealerships. A 9-5 liftback and a new 9-5X were also planned, as well as an overall facelift around mid-2014.

Trim levels 
Trim/equipment levels vary from country to country.

In the US Saab 9-5 trim levels were Turbo4, Turbo4 Premium, Turbo6 XWD, and Aero. Turbo4 models come with a turbocharged four-cylinder and features that included power adjustable driver and passenger seats, leather upholstery, five-spoke alloy wheels, fog lamps, and rain-sensing wipers. 
The Turbo4 Premium added a panoramic sunroof, headlamp washers, Saab parking assistance, keyless entry and start, memory seats, and 18-inch alloy wheels, while the Turbo6 XWD was powered by a turbocharged six-cylinder engine and features an all-wheel-drive system. 
The top trim Aero featured 15-spoke “Rotor” 18-inch alloy wheels, leather-trimmed sports seats, a multi-color central information display, Bi-Xenon SmartBeam headlamps, dark titanium-effect interior trim, aluminum sports pedals, a sports-tuned suspension system with real-time damping, and Aero exterior elements.

UK equipment levels for the 2012 model year included the Vector SE and Aero and both sedan and estate. The previous base models, Linear and Vector were replaced by the Vector SE model.

In Australia the base trim (Linear) was not part of the line up, only the Vector and Aero trims were available.

Engines
In North America, the engine choices were either a turbocharged V6 or an Ecotec I4. Other countries also had an optional turbodiesel I4 engine.

Transmissions and layout

Safety

Reviews
Auto Express For: spacious cabin, distinctive styling, well equipped.Against: poor residuals, driving dynamics, cheap cabin materials.
Auto Trader Pros: low CO2 and high mpg, distinctive design, plenty of room.Cons: interior quality disappointing, outclassed by rivals, holds value poorly.
Parker's Pros: Much kit as standard, high-tech features, driver comfort, practicality.Cons: Not particularly sporty, still lacks the brand appeal of its German rivals.
The AA Likes: styling typically Saab but updated for the modern era; comfortable seats are a Saab trademark; cabin space is first rate - especially rear legroom; sensible pricing for the mainstream variants.Gripes: simple styling could be viewed as bland by uncharitable critics; can't match Jaguar's XF for sporting character; clutter-free cabin is welcome but quality of materials chosen could have been better; auto gearbox option could be more responsive.

Notes 

9-5
2000s cars
2010s cars
Euro NCAP executive cars
Flexible-fuel vehicles
Front-wheel-drive vehicles
Sports sedans
Station wagons
Flagship vehicles
Cars introduced in 1997
Spyker
Executive cars